My Soul may refer to:

Music

Albums
 My Soul (Coolio album), 1997
 My Soul (Judy Torres album), 1992
 My Soul (Leela James album), 2010
My Soul, by Makoto (musician)

Songs
"My Soul", a song by Gunna from Drip Season 3
"My Soul", a song by Judy Torres from My Soul (Judy Torres album)
"My Soul", a song by Johnny Winter on Guitar Slinger
"My Soul", a song by Lowkey from Soundtrack to the Struggle, 2011